The Moluccan diaspora refers to overseas Indonesians of Moluccan birth or descent living outside Indonesia. The most significant Moluccan diaspora community lives in the Netherlands, where it numbers  70,000 people as of 2018.

Terminology 
In the Netherlands, a number of names are in circulation to refer to its Moluccan community, which do not all technically refer to the same group of people. The most commonly used today is "Moluccan", the term for the native, pre-Transmigrasi inhabitants of the Moluccan Islands.

One of the islands in the archipelago is Ambon. The Ambonese people constitute a clear majority of about 90% of Moluccan Dutch and, as a result, members of the Moluccan community are often referred to as "Ambonese", especially before 1970. The two terms are not synonymous, however, even though they continue to be used as such by both the Dutch and ethnic Ambonese.

Strictly speaking, "South Moluccan" refers to a proponent of the unrecognized Republic of the South Moluccas and is mainly used in political contexts in the Netherlands.

History

Netherlands 

Following the Indonesian War of Independence of 1945–1949, the government of the Netherlands transferred sovereignty over the Dutch East Indies to the United States of Indonesia on 27 December 1949. Attempts at disbanding the federal State of East Indonesia by the unitary Republic of Indonesia and Moluccan distrust of the predominantly Islamic Javanese authorities in Jakarta led to the creation of the Republic of the South Moluccas (RMS) on 25 April 1950. After the Indonesian invasion of Ambon and suppression of Moluccan independence, the Dutch government decided on the evacuation of  12,000 Moluccan soldiers of the former Royal Netherlands East Indies Army and their dependents to the Netherlands, as they were at risk of retribution and had refused discharge from Dutch service in territories controlled by Indonesian authorities. Although the Dutch government had neither supported nor recognized the RMS, its supporters proclaimed a government in exile in the Netherlands on 12 April 1966. As of 2010, its president is the Dutch-born John Wattilete and its leadership is in the hands of second-generation Moluccan Dutch.

Fueled by inaction of Moluccan community leaders and government disinterest for the plight of the diaspora, radicalized Moluccan youths were responsible for a number of terrorist attacks in the Netherlands. These were a foiled attempt to abduct Queen Juliana in the spring of 1975, the Wijster train hijacking and Indonesian consulate hostage crisis of December 1975, the De Punt train hijacking and Bovensmilde school hostage crisis of May 1977, and the Assen province hall hostage crisis of March 1978. Combined, these incidents resulted in the deaths of eight hostages and six attackers, and remain controversial.

References

Indonesian diaspora